Enrico Francescato (Treviso 19 July 1993) is an Italian rugby union player. His usual position is as a Scrum-half, and he currently plays for San Donà.

For 2016–17 Pro12 season, he was an Additional Player for Benetton.

From 2016 to 2017, Francescato was also named in the Italy Sevens squad for the annual Sevens Grand Prix Series.

References

External links 
It's Rugby England Profile
ESPN Profile

Petrarca Rugby players
Italian rugby union players
1993 births
Living people
Rugby union scrum-halves
Sportspeople from Treviso
Italian rugby sevens players